Italo Mazzacurati (13 January 1932 – 13 December 2013) was an Italian racing cyclist. He rode in the 1962 Tour de France.

References

External links
 

1932 births
2013 deaths
Italian male cyclists
Place of birth missing
Sportspeople from the Metropolitan City of Bologna
Cyclists from Emilia-Romagna